The World Para Swimming Championships, known before 30 November 2016 as the IPC Swimming World Championships, are the world championships for swimming where athletes with a disability compete. They are organised by the International Paralympic Committee (IPC). Previously on a four-year rotation, the championships are now held biennially, a year after the regional championships and year prior to the Paralympic Games.

On 30 November 2016, the IPC (which serves as the international federation for 10 disability sports, including swimming) adopted the "World Para" brand for all 10 sports. The world championship events in all of these sports were rebranded as "World Para" championships.

History

World Para Swimming Championships (Long Course)
The first World Para Swimming Championships were held from 2 December until 7 December, 2017, in Mexico City; the first IPC Swimming Championships (the former title of the championships) were held from 14 July until 26 July, 1990, in Assen, one year after the IPC was founded.

World Para Swimming Championships (Short Course)
The first (and only, as of 2023) short course world championships were held in December 2009, in Rio de Janeiro.

See also
List of IPC world records in swimming
World Para Swimming European Championships
Swimming at the Summer Paralympics

References

External links
World Para Swimming webpages
History of IPC Swimming World Championships
2006 Results

 
International swimming competitions
Parasports world championships
Paralympic swimming
Recurring sporting events established in 1990